Christian Daniel Mojica Blanco, known as Cauty, is a Puerto Rican reggaeton singer, songwriter, and producer born in Caguas, Puerto Rico, and raised in San Lorenzo.

Career
Cauty garnered fame thanks to songs such as "Lola" "Lloras", and "Ta To Gucci", which received a remix with Darell, Brytiago, Rafa Pabön, Chencho Corleone, and Cosculluela. The song garnered over 100 million views in YouTube. He has collaborated with musicians such as Maximus Wel, Guaynaa, Jowell & Randy, Farruko, and Ñejo.
Cauty was inspired by Don Omar, Farruko, Arcángel, Daddy Yankee, Héctor el Father and Héctor Lavoe. He has also preferred not to talk about themes like drugs or crime, and has stated he makes music to "hang out".

Cauty's fame rose to an all time high on August 11, 2022 after a publicity stunt he held in a local gas station in the Baldrich neighborhood in Hato Rey in which he gave gasoline at 25.7 cents per liter for regular gas, and 45.7 cents per liter for premium gas.

References

Living people
Puerto Rican reggaeton musicians
21st-century Puerto Rican male musicians
People from Caguas, Puerto Rico
People from San Lorenzo, Puerto Rico
Year of birth missing (living people)